The 1997 season was the Denver Broncos' 28th season in the National Football League (NFL) and their 38th overall. The Broncos finished the season with a record of 12–4, finishing second in the AFC West, and winning Super Bowl XXXII. The Broncos were the second wild card team since the 1970 merger to win a Super Bowl, joining the 1980 Oakland Raiders.

The 1997 season saw the addition of the Denver Broncos' newest wordmark and logo. Their new logo featured a newer, dynamic Bronco, which has been the teams logo since the 1997 season. The new default team colors unveiled prior to the 1997 season were navy blue jerseys with orange and white pants with orange. This would continue until 2012, when they assigned the all navy blue uniforms as the "Main alternate" slot, making the primary uniforms have orange tops, white bottoms and orange/white shoes.

Offseason

NFL draft

Season summary
Having lost a disappointing playoff game to Jacksonville the year before, many thought this might be John Elway's last chance to win a Super Bowl.  They started off the season by winning their first six games, beating the Chiefs, Seahawks, Rams, Bengals, Falcons and Patriots in the first game between the last two unbeaten NFL teams since 1973. They then lost to the Raiders, then defeated the Bills, Seahawks, and Panthers.  They then lost to the Chiefs, beat the Raiders and the Chargers, lost to the Steelers and the 49ers, but finished the season with a win against the Chargers.

They made the playoffs as a wildcard and advanced against the Jaguars and Chiefs and defeated the Steelers in the 1997 AFC Championship Game.  They then won Super Bowl XXXII against the Packers 31–24, only the second team since the NFL/AFL merger in 1970 to ever win a Super Bowl as a wildcard, and the first AFC team to win the title since the Los Angeles Raiders in Super Bowl XVIII following the 1983 season.  The win was a big morale boost to Denver and the Broncos, who had suffered through four previous Super Bowl losses, and especially Elway, who had led three of those defeats.

The 1997 Broncos were tenth in the league in total passing yards with 3704 and fourth in the league in total rushing yards with 2378.  They finished with 6082 total yards, first in the NFL.  They were fourth in total yards given up with 4969.  They were also first in total points scored with 472.  They were seventh in total points allowed with 287.

The team's 12–4 record is their fifth-best 16-game season in franchise history.

During the season John Elway threw for 3635 yards and Terrell Davis rushed for 1750 yards.  Rod Smith had 70 receptions for 1180 yards and Ed McCaffrey had 45 receptions for 590 yards.  Tight end Shannon Sharpe has 72 receptions for 1107 yards.  Kicker Jason Elam kicked 26 field goals out of 36 attempted.  Davis, Elway, Tom Nalen, Sharpe, and Neil Smith made the Pro Bowl.

Personnel

Staff

Roster

Preseason

Regular season

Schedule

Game summaries

Week 1

Week 2

Week 3

Week 4

Week 5

Week 6

Week 8

Week 9

Week 10

Week 11

Week 12

Week 13

Week 14

Week 15

Week 16

Week 17

Standings

Playoffs

Wild Card

In the 1997 AFC Wildcard Playoff weekend, the Broncos were paired against the Jacksonville Jaguars. The Broncos viewed this game as a chance to avenge the previous season's Divisional Playoff loss of 30–27 to the Jaguars, an early exit in a year the Broncos were favored to win the Super Bowl. Ultimately, 21 unanswered 4th quarter points saw the Broncos seize the win and a playoff berth against the Division Champion Kansas City Chiefs.

Divisional

AFC Championship Game

Super Bowl

Awards and records
 Terrell Davis, Super Bowl MVP
John Elway, Franchise Record, Most Touchdowns in One Season, 27 Touchdown Passes

References

External links
  at Pro-Football-Reference.com

Denver Broncos seasons
American Football Conference championship seasons
Super Bowl champion seasons
Denver Broncos
Bronco